Thank You...Goodnight! is a live album released by the American hard rock band Great White in 2002. The album has the subtitle 'The Farewell Concert', because it contains the final performance of the band before disbandment, as announced by singer Jack Russell in November 2001. The concert was held at The Galaxy Theatre in Santa Ana, California, on December 31, 2001, and for the occasion original guitarist Mark Kendall and Sean McNabb rejoined the band. Russell and Kendall were anyway on the road again under the name 'Jack Russell's Great White' already in 2002. Two new songs, "Back to the Rhythm" and "Play On", are recorded on this album for the first time and reappeared in 2007 on the album Back to the Rhythm.

The album was reissued in 2006 by Californian label Sidewinder Music under the name Once Bitten, Twice Live.

Track listing 
 "Desert Moon" – 4:58
 "Old Rose Motel" – 7:45
 "Face the Day" – 6:12
 "On Your Knees" – 4:57
 "House of Broken Love" – 5:58
 "Back to the Rhythm" – 4:34
 "Save Your Love" – 5:05
 "Play On" – 3:57
 "Mista Bone" – 5:50
 "Rock Me" – 7:45
 "Call It Rock 'n' Roll" – 4:47
 "Can't Shake It" – 9:33
 "Once Bitten, Twice Shy" – 7:53

Personnel

Band members 
Jack Russell – lead and backing vocals
Mark Kendall – guitar, backing vocals
Michael Lardie – guitar, keyboards, backing vocals, producer, mixing
Sean McNabb – bass
Derrick Pontier – drums

Production 
Tom Fletcher – live sound
Kreg Black – engineer

References 

Great White live albums
2002 live albums
2006 live albums